Jang Su-jeong defeated Rebeka Masarova in the final, 3–6, 6–3, 6–1 to win the women's singles tennis title at the 2022 Swedish Open.

Nuria Párrizas Díaz was the reigning champion, but chose not to participate.

Seeds

Draw

Finals

Top half

Bottom half

References

External links
Main Draw

Swedish Open - Singles